The United States of America is a 1975 film by James Benning and Bette Gordon.

≤==Summary==
A conceptual bicentennial film dealing with spatial and temporal spaces about two travelers in their car alongside the relationships to changes in America (political, social and geographical) from New York to Los Angeles.

Legacy
The Criterion Channel describes it as "one of the major works of the structuralist film movement of the 1970s".

A remake of the film, also directed by Benning, premiered in 2022.

See also
United States Bicentennial
Road movie

References

External links

The United States of America on MUBI

1970s avant-garde and experimental films
1975 films
Films directed by James Benning
1970s American films
Films directed by Bette Gordon